The 1967–68 Greenlandic Football Championship was the 6th edition of the Greenlandic Men's Football Championship. The final round was held in Nuuk. It was the first football championship won by Tupilak-41.

Qualifying stage

North Greenland
Tupilak-41 qualified for the final Round.

Central Greenland

Siumut Amerdlok Kunuk qualified for the final Round.

South Greenland

Kissaviarsuk-33 qualified for the final Round.

Final round

See also
Football in Greenland
Football Association of Greenland
Greenland national football team
Greenlandic Football Championship

References

Greenlandic Men's Football Championship seasons
Green
Foot
Foot